Kenneth Wayne Paul Tobias (born July 25, 1945) is a Canadian singer-songwriter. He is noted for penning the 1971 chart-topping hit for The Bells, "Stay Awhile", and for several top-selling recordings of his own.

Early career
Born and raised in Saint John, New Brunswick, Tobias worked as a draftsman in the early 1960s while also appearing as a musician at local venues in Saint John. He joined a folk group named the Ramblers in 1961, playing guitar, and he later played drums in a rock band called the Badd Cedes. He moved to Halifax, Nova Scotia in 1965 and became a cast member for a local CBC Television show called Music Hop. He was a regular performer from 1966 to 1968 on the national variety program called Singalong Jubilee, which was also produced in Halifax. His duets with fellow cast-member and later recording star Anne Murray were well regarded. Also appearing on the show were such recognized performers as Gene MacLellan and John Allan Cameron. After three seasons in Halifax and Montreal, in 1968, Tobias met Bill Medley of the Righteous Brothers who invited him to Los Angeles to record and write as a salaried songwriter. Under the management of Medley's company, Tobias recorded his first single "You’re Not Even Going to the Fair" on Bell Records; like many of his early releases it was credited just to "Tobias". The song won him his first Canadian BMI award for airplay. This was the first of many BMI, Procan and SOCAN awards.

In 1970, he penned "Stay Awhile". Though originally conceived as a country-tinged solo piece, the song would emerge as a sensual duet by The Bells and became a soft rock classic of the early 1970s, peaking in 1971 at No. 1 in Canada and No. 7 on the US Billboard charts. "Stay Awhile" sold more than two million copies worldwide.

Solo artist
After travelling back and forth between Los Angeles and Montreal, in 1972, Tobias settled in Toronto where he played as a backing musician with various bands. With his brother Tony Tobias, he established Glooscap Music and released several solo recordings that enjoyed extensive airplay in Canada, including "Fly Me High", and "Lady Luck". Ken Tobias is one of the few Canadians to receive the Socan Classics Award for 100,000 airplays of a given song, of which he has five awards, for "Stay Awhile", "I Just Want to Make Music", "Every Bit of Love", "Give a Little Love" and "Dream #2". To date, Ken Tobias has released eight albums and one radio sampler on various record labels. He has also released about twenty singles.

In 1978, he toured Europe, and while there he collaborated on the soundtrack of the Italian Spaghetti Western Sella d'Argento (Silver Saddle/They Died with Their Boots On), directed by Lucio Fulci.

Recent career
Tobias lived in Toronto through the 1990s before returning to his native Saint John, where he now lives, painting and continuing to write and perform music, and encouraging younger talents through the Songwriters Association of Canada. In 2002, he produced the debut album for Canadian artist Kim Jarrett. He has also collaborated with local Saint John artist Jessica Rhaye.

In 2008, Tobias released From a Distance, his first new album in 24 years.

Discography

Singles
 "You're Not Even Going to the Fair" (Bell, 1969) (#78 CAN)
 "Now I'm in Love" (1971) (#82 CAN)
 "I'd Like to Know" (1971)
 "Dream #2" (MGM/Verve 1972) (#23 CAN)
 "I Just Want to Make Music" (1973) (#9 CAN)
 "Fly Me High" (1973) (#24 CAN)
 "On the Other Side" (1974)
 "Lover Come Quickly" (1974)
 "Lady Luck" (1975) (#31 CAN)
 "Run Away with Me" (1975) (#52 CAN)
 "Every Bit of Love" (1975) (#17 CAN)
 "Give a Little Love" (1976) (#21 CAN)
 "Oh Lynda" (1976)
 "Lovin' Fever" (1976)
 "Dancer" (1977) (#53 CAN)
 "Lovelight" (1977) (#54 CAN)
 "I Don't Want to Be Alone" (1978) (#80 CAN)
 "New York City" (1978) (#88 CAN)
 "Here You Are Today" (1983)

References

Further reading
 Dave Bidini, On a Cold Road: Tales of Adventure in Canadian Rock (1998) Toronto: McClelland & Stewart

External links
 Official website
 Canadian Encyclopedia
 Kim Jarrett
 Answers.com (John Bush, Allmusic)
 CanConRox bio
 CHUM Chart positions
 Original version (sample) of "Stay Awhile"

1945 births
Living people
Canadian singer-songwriters
Canadian rock singers
Canadian male singers
Musicians from Saint John, New Brunswick
Attic Records (Canada) artists
Canadian male singer-songwriters